Sumona Haque (Bengali: সুমনা হক) is a Bangladeshi singer who mainly sings jingles and audio albums. For her immense success in jingles, she is referred as Jingle Express. She has lent her voice to albums like  Mayabi Ey Raate (1988), Majhe Kichu Bochor Gelo (2000), Tumi Robe Nirobe (2008) and Kichu Sriti Kichu Bedona (2015). Her only playback was the song "Monete Ki Nojore Ki" in the film Balika Holo Bondhu (1994), a duet with Shuvro Dev.

Early life and education
Sumona was born in Dhaka. Her mother Khaleda Adib Chowdhury was a poet. She studied at Drawing and Painting Department of the Faculty of Fine Arts of the University of Dhaka.

Career
Sumona started her career in 1986 by singing jingles. She was enlisted by Bangladesh Television in the mid-1980s. Her debut album came in 1988 titled Mayabi Ei Raate. The title song "Mayabi Ei Raate" was penned by her mother, poet Khaleda Edib Chowdhury and Ahmed Yousuf Saber became immensely popular.

Sumona Haque has lent her voice for many popular jingles like Manola, Bourani Print Sari, Meryl Baby Lotion, Olympic Battery, Sundori Print Sari etc. She came back after 12 years with her second album Majhe Kichhu Bochhor Gelo in 2000. After that she went into a long hiatus, only to return in 2008 with a Tagore album called Tumi Robe Nirobe. In 2015, she presented the album Kichu Smriti Kichu Bedona which is her last album till date. This album has been composed by Indian composer Joshpal Mani and recorded in Mumbai. It consists of seven songs among which four have music videos. She has performed a new version of this song in 2016 in a television show Power Lounge.

Apart from singing, she is also a professional painter. She has completed five solo exhibitions of her paintings, among whom three were held in Bangladesh and rest were held in Japan and USA. In March 2014, she has launched a solo painting exhibition containing her paintings, which is her sixth. She drew all the paintings using oil paint.

Discography

Studio albums

film songs

References

1970 births
Living people
University of Dhaka Faculty of Fine Arts alumni
Bangladeshi playback singers
20th-century Bangladeshi women singers
20th-century Bangladeshi singers
21st-century Bangladeshi women singers
21st-century Bangladeshi singers